Devika Purnendu Vaidya (born 13 August 1997) is an Indian cricketer. She plays for Maharashtra in domestic matches.

She selected for South Africa tour of India in 2014 and made Women's Twenty20 International (WT20I) debut at Bangalore on 30 November 2014. She was also named M A Chidambaram Trophy for best woman junior cricketer 2014–15.

In November 2018, she was added to India's squad for the 2018 ICC Women's World Twenty20 tournament in the West Indies, replacing Pooja Vastrakar, who was ruled out due to an injury she learned in Maharashtra Mandal at her child age.
She's Again Added to Indian Squad for T-20 series against Australia for December 22- Jan 23 series.

Awards 

 M A Chidambaram Trophy for best woman junior cricketer 2014–15

References

1997 births
Living people
Indian women cricketers
India women Twenty20 International cricketers
Maharashtra women cricketers
Cricketers from Pune
Sportswomen from Maharashtra
West Zone women cricketers
IPL Velocity cricketers
UP Warriorz cricketers